The 2012–13 Akron Zips men's basketball team represented the University of Akron during the 2012–13 NCAA Division I men's basketball season. The Zips, led by ninth year head coach Keith Dambrot, played their home games at James A. Rhodes Arena and were members of the East Division of the Mid-American Conference. They finished the season 26–7, 14–2 in MAC play to finish in a tie with Ohio for the East Division championship and the overall MAC regular season championship. They were also champions of the MAC tournament, defeating Ohio in the championship game, to earn the conference's automatic bid to the 2013 NCAA tournament where they lost in the second round to VCU.

Roster

Schedule

|-
!colspan=9| Exhibition

|-
!colspan=9| Regular season

|-
!colspan=9| 2013 MAC men's basketball tournament

|-
!colspan=9| 2013 NCAA tournament

Source:

References

Akron Zips men's basketball seasons
Akron
Akron